Zonophone (early on also rendered as Zon-O-Phone) was a record label founded in 1899 in Camden, New Jersey, by Frank Seaman. The Zonophone name was not that of the company but was applied to records and machines sold by Seaman's Universal Talking Machine Company from 1899 to 1903. The name was subsequently acquired by Columbia Records, the Victor Talking Machine Company, and finally the Gramophone Company/EMI Records.  It has been used for a number of record publishing labels by these companies.

1899–1910s
Emile Berliner, the inventor of the lateral-groove disc record and the Gramophone, formed a partnership with machinist Eldridge Reeves Johnson, who had improved Berliner's Gramophone to the point of marketability, and with former typewriter promoter Frank Seaman. Berliner was to hold the patents; Johnson had manufacturing rights; and Seaman had selling rights.

1920s–1970s

In West Africa (primarily today's Ghana and Nigeria) Zonophone was used as a label to record and produce Sakara, Juju and Apala music on 78 rpm discs from 1928 to the early 1950s.

See also
 List of record labels

References

External links
 US Zonophone masters in the Discography of American Historical Recordings
 Regal Zonophone label profile
 Highlife Piccadilly: "African Music on 45 rpm records in the UK, 1954–1981" (19 May 1999). Ray Templeton
 Scans of British 78 rpm record labels: includes a large number of Zonophone & Regal-Zonophone labels.

Record labels established in 1899
Record labels disestablished in 1903
Record labels established in 2007
Re-established companies
British record labels
EMI
American record labels
Parlophone subsidiaries
1899 establishments in New Jersey
1903 disestablishments in New Jersey